The Presian Inscription or Philippi Inscription is a medieval Greek text inscribed upon a stone in Philippi during the reign of the Bulgarian ruler Presian I (r. 836–852).

Background history 
In 837, soon after Presian's accession, the Slavs in the vicinity of Thessalonica rebelled against the Byzantine Empire.  Emperor Theophilos sought Bulgarian support in putting down the rebellion, but simultaneously arranged for his fleet to sail through the Danube delta and undertake a clandestine evacuation of some of the Byzantine captives settled in trans-Danubian Bulgaria by the Bulgarian rulers Krum and Omurtag. In retaliation the kavhan Isbul campaigned along the Aegean coasts of Thrace and Macedonia and captured the city of Philippi, where he set up a surviving memorial inscription in a local church.  Isbul's campaign may also have resulted in the establishment of Bulgarian suzerainty over the local Slavic tribe of the Smolyani.

Content

Original

Translation

References
Die protobulgarischen Inschriften By Veselin Beshevliev
Southeastern Europe in the Middle Ages, 500-1250 By Florin Curta Page 166 

Bulgarian Greek inscriptions
9th-century inscriptions
Medieval Macedonia
Inscriptions in medieval Macedonia
Ancient Philippi